Mizz Magazine was a monthly  magazine published in the United Kingdom, and was aimed at teenage and pre-teen girls (usually to those between the ages of 11 and 14).

History and profile
Mizz was first published in April 1985. In March 2006 the magazine was sold by IPC Media to Panini UK. The magazine was published on a fortnightly basis until 2012 when its frequency was changed to monthly.

Mizz incorporated pages of  fashion; displaying clothing trends, using models ranging from 12 to 16 years old. It encouraged its readers to write in about events in their life, varying from serious to comic issues. It also contained information about celebrities in a 'gossip' form. The magazine also included information on how to deal with teenage issues related to puberty, hygiene, friends and relationships. It had a range of competitions and quizzes and posters. It often came with freebies.

In 2012 online version of Mizz was started. However, the magazine  folded in 2013.

Say what?
Mizz readers could post comments in this section of the magazine. They usually talked about celebrities, brilliant sections of the magazine or stuff that they really like. A Star Letter was chosen every fortnight. The writer of the Star Letter used to get a T-shirt. You could also post "text messages" and say "hi" to your friends. Other sections of the Say What? section were "Get It Or Regret It" section which show items that the editor likes, a "Top Pet" section which readers show their pets and a "Sizzlin and Fizzlin" 
section. You could send Mizz your say by email, text or letter.

Real life
In the real life section, every issue showed a different story that someone has shared, about something "crazy, dramatic or unusual", usually there was a story about someone being hurt or a terrible experience. For example, in issue 652 the real life was "I'll never walk again".

References

External links

1985 establishments in the United Kingdom
2013 disestablishments in the United Kingdom
Biweekly magazines published in the United Kingdom
Children's magazines published in the United Kingdom
Defunct magazines published in the United Kingdom
Magazines established in 1985
Magazines disestablished in 2013
Monthly magazines published in the United Kingdom
Teen magazines